Ace o' Clubs is a fictional public drinking establishment in the DC Comics universe, owned and run by former prize fighter Bibbo Bibbowski.

Fictional history
The Ace o' Clubs was a public drinking establishment located on 1938 Simon Street, Hob's Bay, better known as the Suicide Slum neighborhood of Metropolis. It was owned and operated by Bibbo Bibbowski, who purported himself to be Superman's biggest fan. Bibbo becomes a more significant part of the comic when he finds a winning lottery ticket dropped by Gangbuster and uses the money to buy the Ace o' Clubs bar and help those living in the Slum.

In fact, Bibbo maintained a zero-tolerance attitude against any patron who dared to bad-mouth the Man of Steel. It was not uncommon for Bibbo to personally toss such an individual out on their ear. Like most bars and pubs, the Ace o' Clubs was no stranger to violence. To keep the peace, Bibbo always had his trusty double-barrel shotgun at the ready should things ever get too wild. The Ace o' Clubs was occasionally victimized by various citywide threats, all of which involved Superman in some way.

During the "Battle for Metropolis", a group of looters began vandalizing the front window, but Bibbo drove them away.

The Ace o' Clubs bar is the site of a battle between the life-force devouring Parasite and Aztek. Bibbo and his friends purposely ignore the fight, playing cards instead and trusting others to handle the villain.

In other media

Television
  Ace o' Clubs appears along with Bibbo in the Lois and Clark: The New Adventures of Superman episode "Double Jeopardy".
 Ace o' Clubs appeared (as an upscale nightclub) in Smallville'''s seventh season and numerous times in the eighth season.

Film
 Ace o' Clubs appears in an early scene in Superman Returns. Bibbo Bibowski is the bar tender played by Jack Larson (who had portrayed Jimmy Olsen in the 1950s Adventures of Superman).
 Ace o' Clubs appears in a cameo in the Man of Steel in the background during the fight between Superman and General Zod.

Video games
 In DC Universe Online, the Ace o'Clubs is located in Suicide Slum. It is part of the Booster Gold Tour, and Superman can be found on its roof for the "Fanboy" feat.
 In Injustice 2'', the Ace o'Clubs is one of the playable areas in the Metropolis arena. Bibbo Bibbowski can be seen behind the bar serving customers in the background, while the bar itself is decorated with nods to his boxing career and other events from Superman comics.

Theme parks
 At Warner Bros. Movie World the entrance to the Ace o' Clubs is blocked by Bizarro.

References

Superman
DC Comics organizations
Fictional companies
Metropolis (comics)
Fictional drinking establishments
1987 in comics